Lonely Boys is a band from Ngukurr, Northern Territory, a remote aboriginal community on the Roper River in Arnhem Land. They play a mix of punk, rock and metal. 

Their lead guitarist died in a car accident on October 21, 2018.

Their lead singer died after a pedestrian accident near his hometown on December 12, 2020.

Members
Ambrose Daniels
Winston Joshua (Foster)
Thomas Wurramara
Burt Rami
Kasley Daniels
Leon Daniels
Dylan Daniels
Benjamin Wilfred 
Anton Rami 
Ben Mangi

Discography
Lonely Child (2007)
The Hunter EP (2017) - Skinnyfish

References

Indigenous Australian musical groups
Northern Territory musical groups